Haplothrips leucanthemi, known generally as the clover thrips or red clover thrips, is a species of tube-tailed thrip in the family Phlaeothripidae. It is found in North America, South America, and Europe.

References

Further reading

 
 
 
 

Phlaeothripidae
Articles created by Qbugbot
Insects described in 1781